Elections to Ellesmere Port and Neston Borough Council were held on 4 May 2000. One third of the council was up for election and the Labour Party stayed in overall control of the council.

After the election, the composition of the council was:
Labour 36
Conservative 6
Liberal Democrat 1

Results

References
2000 Ellesmere Port and Neston election result

2000 English local elections
2000
2000s in Cheshire